On 1 September 2022, Argentine Vice President Cristina Fernández de Kirchner was the target of an assassination attempt. A man approached her as she met with supporters outside of her official residence in Recoleta, Buenos Aires, and attempted to fire a semi-automatic pistol inches from her face. The pistol failed to fire, and the suspect was immediately arrested on scene.

The suspect has been identified as Fernando André Sabag Montiel, a 35-year-old man who was born in Brazil and has lived in Argentina since 1993. He is in police custody while the investigation continues.

Background

Fernández de Kirchner had previously served as the President of Argentina, being elected after her husband, Néstor Kirchner, declined to run for a second term in 2007. She served two terms before leaving office in 2015. She was the running mate of Alberto Fernández in the 2019 presidential election, and after winning the election, she has been serving as the vice president since December 2019.

Fernández de Kirchner has an ongoing trial for alleged corruption charges during her presidency and on 23 August 2022, having finished stating his case, federal prosecutor Diego Luciani requested the tribunal to convict Fernández de Kirchner and to sentence her to 12-year imprisonment and ineligibility from public office for allegedly leading a criminal conspiracy that irregularly awarded public works contracts to the construction firm of a friend and ally, Lázaro Báez, during the presidencies of both Fernández de Kirchner and her husband and predecessor Néstor Kirchner. In response, members of the opposition staged several demonstrations in front of her residence calling for her resignation, followed by government supporters doing the same as a counter-protest. Demonstrations began almost a week before the attempt took place and were virtually constant. Fernández de Kirchner rebuffed the opposition protests, even giving a speech to her supporters on an improvised podium where she called the opposition protests a product of "hatred for Peronism" and called for both opposition and pro-government protesters to return home.

Several events of violence between supporters and opposition, including the detention of a man for sporting an adjustable spanner as a potential weapon and clashes with the Buenos Aires City Police, had already occurred by the day of the attempt. On 30 August 2022, in apparent response to the groups of people that had gathered outside her residence, a judge requested federal protection for Fernández de Kirchner, transferring her protection responsibility to federal security authorities, rather than the local Buenos Aires City Police protection she had been afforded up to that point.

Attempted assassination

On 1 September 2022 at 8:50 p.m. (UTC–3), Fernández de Kirchner had just returned to her official residence at Recoleta, Buenos Aires, after presiding over a session at the Senate. As she was signing copies of her book Sinceramente for her supporters, the suspect managed to approach her, getting into her immediate proximity and pulling the trigger of a semi-automatic pistol mere inches from her face, which failed to fire. According to initial reports, Fernández de Kirchner appeared to have shielded her face with her hand and ducked, though she later said she had not seen the gun. Another report said she may have stooped to pick up something from the ground. She was otherwise unharmed and the suspect was immediately arrested by her security detail.

The Bersa caliber 32 semi-automatic pistol used in the attack was later recovered close to the scene. It was fully loaded with five cartridges although no round was found in the chamber of the weapon. It was reported that the assailant attempted to fire the gun twice, failing both times. Its serial number was partially removed but the weapon was otherwise deemed "fit for firing" by official sources.

According to The Guardian, several reports stated that the suspect may not have pulled the trigger. However, audio from several videos of the attack recorded an audible clicking sound.

Suspect

The suspect was identified as Fernando André Sabag Montiel (born 13 January 1987), a 35-year-old Brazilian man from La Paternal, Buenos Aires, who has resided in Argentina since 1993. He worked as an Uber driver. On 17 March 2021, Sabag Montiel was arrested for possession of a 35-centimetre long knife in his vehicle during a traffic police inspection of the vehicle's missing rear license plate, and he was charged with carrying "non-conventional weapons". The case was dropped by the prosecution as "it was not an important matter".

In the weeks before the attack, he was interviewed on the street by Crónica TV criticizing the government's welfare programs, claiming they made people "lazy". During the television interview and in his social media posts, Sabag Montiel made statements condemning both Fernández de Kirchner and her opponent Javier Milei.

Sabag Montiel has a Black Sun tattoo on his left elbow (a Nazi symbol) and an Iron Cross tattoo on his right hand. He was noted as following a wide range of occult beliefs on social media such as the Wicca pagan religion, "satanic communism", "hermetic occult sciences" and "anti-psychopathic coach", in addition to radical or hate groups. The accounts were deactivated shortly after the attack. He had been reported in the past for gender violence and animal abuse.

As of 3 September 2022, Sabag Montiel is detained in an isolated cell in a Federal Police facility and has refused to testify. The following day, Sabag Montiel's girlfriend, Brenda Uliarte, was detained on orders of the judge after an analysis of Sabag Montiel's movements coupled with statements from another friend concluded that he had allegedly been with her on the night of the attempted assassination.

Aftermath

President Alberto Fernández announced that the investigation would be led by federal judge María Eugenia Capuchetti and the case prosecuted by Carlos Rívolo. The suspect will be defended by public defender Juan Manuel Hermida. The charge of attempted homicide is slated to be laid against the suspect. Initial investigations did not reveal any ties of the suspect to any organisation, and are working to see if he had accomplices in the act. Investigators raiding the suspect's rented home at the Villa Zagala neighbourhood discovered about 100 bullets. The Argentine Senate has set up a commission to investigate the attack.

In a  a few hours after the incident, President Alberto Fernández said, "This is the most serious event since we recovered our democracy." He declared the following day a national holiday, which was ignored by the opposition-ruled provinces of Jujuy and Mendoza. The government called for its citizens to rally at Plaza de Mayo on 2 September in support of Fernández de Kirchner, resulting in huge crowds of demonstrators across Buenos Aires and other cities. Amongst the slogans used were "Enough hate" and "If they touch Cristina, what chaos we'll make".

Several government ministers, including former president Mauricio Macri, and foreign nations condemned the attempted assassination. A bipartisan draft resolution was passed on 3 September by the Chamber of Deputies repudiating the attempted assassination. The Republican Proposal party left the chamber after voting for it, with its leader Cristian Ritondo saying the chamber was not meant to be a "space that replicates those declarations" by the head of state, and that the opposition had demonstrated unity with the government on the issue.

Conspiracy theories have been raised claiming that the attempted assassination was staged. The provincial deputy of Santa Fe, Amalia Granata, described it as a "pantomime". A similar opinion also appeared in an article by a Spanish journalist published by the portal Libertad Digital. Political scientist Pedro Núñez from the Latin American Social Research Institute said in a statement to Deutsche Welle: "The justice system obviously has to act quickly, since the worst that could happen is that this is diluted over time and more and more conspiracy theories appear about what happened".

Nicolás Maduro, president of Venezuela, proposed that Argentina should have a law against hate speech similar to the Venezuelan one. Some Kirchnerist politicians, like Victoria Donda, had been blaming the attack on a perceived hate speech from the media, the opposition and the judiciary. Mayor Horacio Rodríguez Larreta rejected it as an attempt to impose limits to the freedom of the press. Casa Rosada spokeswoman Gabriela Cerruti pointed out that the government is not working on any draft bill over the topic.

See also
 List of people who survived assassination attempts

References

External links
 

2022 in Argentina 
2022 crimes in Argentina
2020s in Buenos Aires
September 2022 events in Argentina
September 2022 crimes in South America
Crime in Buenos Aires
Failed assassination attempts in South America
Presidency of Alberto Fernández
Attempted assassination